Cuciurul is the Romanian name for two villages in Chernivtsi Oblast, Ukraine:

Cuciurul Mare, or Velykyi Kuchuriv Commune
Cuciurul Mic, or Mali Kuchuriv Commune